The Civil Reserve Air Fleet is part of the United States's mobility resources. Selected aircraft from U.S. airlines, contractually committed to Civil Reserve Air Fleet, support United States Department of Defense airlift requirements in emergencies when the need for airlift exceeds the capability of available military aircraft.

History
In 1952, after aircraft were commandeered for the Berlin Airlift, the Civil Reserve Air Fleet (CRAF) was created as a more orderly way of serving emergency military needs.

The Fleet has two main segments: international and national (domestic).

CRAF has been activated three times. The first activation was as part of Operation Desert Shield. The second was once as part of Operation Iraqi Freedom. In 2021 it was activated as part of Operation Allies Refuge in Afghanistan.

Membership commitment and requirements

The airlines contractually pledge aircraft to the various segments of Civil Reserve Air Fleet, ready for activation when needed. To provide incentives for civil carriers to commit aircraft to the Civil Reserve Air Fleet program and to assure the United States of adequate airlift reserves, the government makes peacetime Department of Defense (DoD) airlift business available to civilian airlines that offer aircraft to the Civil Reserve Air Fleet. DoD offers business through the International Airlift Services. For fiscal year 2005, the guaranteed portion of the contract was $418 million. Air Mobility Command (AMC) previously reported that throughout fiscal 2005 it planned to award more than $1.5 billion in additional business beyond the guaranteed portion of the contract.

To join the Civil Reserve Air Fleet, carriers must maintain a minimum commitment of 40% of its Civil Reserve Air Fleet capable passenger and cargo fleet. Aircraft committed must be US registered, and carriers must commit and maintain at least four complete crews for each aircraft.

Fleet
, the Civil Reserve Air Fleet consists of 450 aircraft from 24 airlines. This breaks down to 413 aircraft for international operations, with 268 considered to be in the "long-range international" category and 145 in the "short-range international" section, as well as 37 aircraft in the "national" segment. These numbers are subject to change on a monthly basis.

Contracts 
The U.S. Department of Defense regularly issues contracts and task orders within the Civil Air Reserve Fleet program. For example, on October 1, 2018, U.S. Transportation Command issued millions of dollars of task orders to members of the Civil Air Reserve Fleet. On October 1, 2019, U.S. Transportation Command again issued millions of dollars of task orders to members of the Civil Air Reserve Fleet for charter airlift services. Less than one year's worth of Civil Air Reserve Fleet operations (18 November 2015 through 30 September 2016) was worth roughly $357 million.

Membership 

The following air carriers are members of the Civil Reserve Air Fleet:

Long-range international 

ABX Air
Air Transport International
American Airlines
Amerijet International
Atlas Air
Delta Air Lines
FedEx Express
Hawaiian Airlines
Kalitta Air
National Airlines (N8)
Omni Air International
Polar Air Cargo
United Airlines
UPS Airlines
Western Global Airlines

Short-range international 

ABX Air
Alaska Airlines
Amerijet International
Delta Air Lines
JetBlue Airways
Lynden Air Cargo
National Airlines (N8)
Northern Air Cargo
Sun Country Airlines
United Airlines
USA Jet

Domestic 

Allegiant Air
Everts Air Cargo
Southwest Airlines

References

External links

 Civil Reserve Air Fleet Program at the U.S. Department of Transportation
 Civil Reserve Air Fleet at the U.S. Air Force

Aviation in the United States
United States Department of Defense agencies